Pherson is an unincorporated community in Pickaway County, in the U.S. state of Ohio.

History
A post office was established at Pherson in 1887, and remained in operation until 1910. Isaac A. Pherson, the first postmaster, gave the community his name.

References

Unincorporated communities in Pickaway County, Ohio
Unincorporated communities in Ohio